Blindsight is a neurological phenomenon.

Blindsight may also refer to:
 Blindsight (Cook novel), a 1992 novel written by Robin Cook
 Blindsight (film), a 2006 documentary film directed by Lucy Walker
 Blindsight (Watts novel), a 2006 novel written by Peter Watts
 Blindsight, a 2005 novel written by Maurice Gee
 Blindsighted, a 2002 novel written by Karin Slaughter